Richhill railway station was on the Ulster Railway in Northern Ireland.

The Ulster Railway opened the station on 1 March 1848.

It closed on 10 October 1957.

Proposals
As of 2014, there was some discussion about reopening the line between Portadown and Armagh.  Therefore, a new station at Richhill would be likely, probably close to Stonebridge or Fruitfield.

Routes

References

Disused railway stations in County Armagh
Railway stations opened in 1848
Railway stations closed in 1957
Proposed railway stations in Northern Ireland

Railway stations in Northern Ireland opened in 1848